This is a list of the Sites of Special Scientific Interest (SSSIs) in the Blaenau Gwent Area of Search (AoS).

History
This Area of Search was mainly formed from parts of the previous AoS of Gwent as well as part of Brecknock.

Sites
 Brynmawr Sections
 Cwm Clydach
 Cwm Merddog Woodlands
 Mynydd Llangatwg (Mynydd Llangattock)

See also
 List of SSSIs by Area of Search

References

Blaenau Gwent
Blaenau Gwent